Fluvidona orphana is a species of minute freshwater snail with an operculum, an aquatic gastropod mollusc or micromollusc in the family Hydrobiidae.

Etymology
The specific epithet orphana is derived from the Greek word orphanos, meaning orphan, and refers to the probable extinction of any related species in the surrounding areas because of land clearing for urban development.

Distribution and habitat
This species is endemic to northern New South Wales, Australia. It is known only from Sea Acres Reserve, Port Macquarie, where it lives in a small stream in a patch of remnant coastal rainforest. It differs from all other Fluvidona species in its habit, being
found crawling on palm fronds, etc., in the creek and is also relatively abundant.

See also 
 List of non-marine molluscs of Australia

References

External links

Fluvidona
Gastropods of Australia
Endemic fauna of Australia